Nayah (born Sylvie Mestres) is a French singer.

Career
Nayah launched her music career after six years of studies at the Perpignan Academy of Music and Drama. She was chosen to represent France during the Eurovision Song Contest of 1999 which was held in Jerusalem. Before going to Eurovision, attention was given to her in the French press when they revealed her relationship with the International Raëlian Movement (I.R.M.).  Nayah entered the I.R.M. following her husband, and she had climbed the Guide levels until she became an assistant guide (Level 3).  This happened after she released a first CD in 1988 titled Elohim which presents themes of the Raëlian Philosophy.

Although the singer confirmed that she had left the I.R.M. since 1996, Nayah followed a mobilization of anti-I.R.M associations, fearing that a victory offers a platform that is a little too visible with the International Raëlian Movement. She was not however prohibited from taking part in the contest, where she ranked 19 out of 23.

Nayah has since returned to the I.R.M. Nayah's return was quoted by the I.R.M. several times to point out the ostracism she had been facing and continued to face.  In attempt to reverse this situation, an electronic book called Proud to be Raëlian was published in 2005. A source alleges that Nayah confirmed that she had quit the International Raëlian Movement for good. This source was completely fabricated by the producer and his agent to occult the adherence of Nayah to the International Raëlian Movement. Nayah made a testimony on the subject which is printed on page 145-146 of the book Proud to be Raëlian:

Achievements
 1990: Finalist in Swiss Eurovision
 1996: "Gold Wandering entertainers"
 1997: Gaining 1st Open Show in New Casting in Geneva
 1997: 1st prize with St-Aubin Contest in Switzerland
 1997: Challenge Eddie Barclay
 1998: Finalist of the Rose d' Or with Antibes (France)
 1999: Participation in Eurovision.

Discography
 1988:  Elohim 
 1999: MINOR ROAD 2 titles. I want to give my voice took 19th place in the Eurovision contest)

Quote
"I do nothing but pass while hoping to leave on my passage some drops of humanity." – NayahFootnotes

External links

 https://web.archive.org/web/20160304125322/http://www.compagnie-spectacles.com/spectacle/sosie-celine-dion.html
 

French women singers
Eurovision Song Contest entrants for France
Eurovision Song Contest entrants of 1999
Living people
1960 births